Crithe huna is a species of very small sea snail, a marine gastropod mollusk or micromollusk in the family Cystiscidae.

References

 Severns, M. (2011). Shells of the Hawaiian Islands - The Sea Shells. Conchbooks, Hackenheim. 564 pp. 

Cystiscidae
Gastropods described in 1979
huna